Fossils is a compilation album by indie rock band Dinosaur Jr., released in August 1991 on SST Records. It contains three 7" singles the band had previously released on SST, including a version of the song 'Keep The Glove' which is different from the version on the reissue of Bug, as well as three covers. A deluxe 5"x7" edition, along with an accompanying book box set, was released on Record Store Day 2014.

Track listing

Personnel 
Lee Ranaldo – backing vocals on "Little Fury Things"
Murph – drums
Lou Barlow – bass, ukulele, vocals
J. Mascis – guitar, vocals

References 

Dinosaur Jr. albums
1991 compilation albums
SST Records compilation albums